Hui-Hai Liu is a hydrogeologist and reservoir engineer. He specializes in fracture hydrology, coupled hydrological and mechanical processes, physics and properties of subsurface multiphase flow and transport, and their applications in reservoir engineering and nuclear waste management.

Biography
He received a 1983 B.S. in hydraulic machinery from Beijing Agricultural Engineering University, China, and a 1986 MS in fluid engineering from  Huazhong University of Science and Technology, China, with a thesis "An improved singularity method to describe water flow in hydraulic turbines." He then received a Ph.D. in the United States, with a degree in soil physics from Auburn University in 1995 for a thesis "An experimental and numerical study on fingering flow and mixing of variable density contaminants in porous media".

He served as an assistant professor in the Department of Environmental System Engineering, Clemson University from 1995 to 1997 and came to California in 1997 as research scientist at Lawrence Berkeley National Laboratory (LBNL). He had served as head of the Hydrogeology and Reservoir Dynamics Department at LBNL from 2009 to 2012. Since 2014, he has been with Aramco Research Center.

Research
He has one research monograph and more than 100 peer-reviewed articles/book chapters published,  and made several major original contributions in his areas, including the development of (1) the active fracture model (AFM) that has been used as the base-case theory of flow and transport in unsaturated fractured rock by the Yucca Mountain nuclear waste repository Project, (2) the two-part Hooke's model (TPHM) by generalizing Hooke's law to incorporate mechanical heterogeneity of natural rocks, and (3) a new multiphase-flow theory based on the optimality principle that fingering multiphase flow in the subsurface is self-organized in such a way that total flow resistance is minimal.

Honors
He became a fellow of the Geological Society of America in 2007 and a distinguished member of Society of Petroleum Engineers in 2017. He is also a recipient of Emil Truog soil science award from Soil Science Society of America and a Director's award for exceptional achievement from Lawrence Berkeley National Laboratory.

References

Living people
Hydrogeologists
20th-century births
Huazhong University of Science and Technology alumni
Auburn University alumni
Clemson University faculty
Lawrence Berkeley National Laboratory people
Year of birth missing (living people)
Fellows of the Geological Society of America